Gary W. Rollins (born August 30, 1944) is an American billionaire businessman. He is the chief executive officer (CEO) of Rollins, Inc., the US's largest pest control company.

Early life
Rollins was born on August 30, 1944. His father was O. Wayne Rollins and his mother, Grace Crum Rollins.

Rollins graduated with a bachelor of business administration degree from the University of Tennessee at Chattanooga in 1967.

Career
Rollins was the CEO of Orkin until July 2009. He has been its chairman since February 2004. Additionally, he has been the CEO of Rollins Inc. since July 2001.

He serves on the board of director of RPC, Inc.

On the Forbes 2016 list of the world's billionaires, he was ranked #688 with a net worth of US$2.5 billion.

Personal life
He and his first wife, Ruth Magness, owned a 1,800-acre ranch near Cartersville, Georgia.

They have four children.
 Glen Rollins
 Ruth Ellen Rollins
 Nancy Louise Rollins
 O. Wayne Rollins II

Their son, Glen Rollins, married to Danielle, is suing his father and his uncle Randall Rollins, chairman of Rollins Inc, over "rightful cash allocations". Glen's three siblings have all joined him in the lawsuit, as has his mother Ruthie, who filed for divorce from Gary at about the same time. Randall Rollins' five children are taking their father and Gary's side. Glen and Danielle have also begun divorce proceedings. The family's "pest control empire" is worth about $8 billion.

Rollins' second wife is Kathleen (Wingard) Rollins.

In June 2018, it was announced that Rollins and wife Kathleen had given a gift of $40 million to his alma mater, University of Tennessee at Chattanooga, in which the College of Business will now be named the Gary W. Rollins College of Business.

References

1944 births
Living people
American chief executives
American billionaires